The Atashgah Manmade-Cave or Atashgah Cave is located 20 km northwest of Kashmar city, Razavi Khorasan province, Iran and the cave has two entrance passages.

See also 
 Atashgah Castle

References 

Caves of Iran
Buildings and structures in Kashmar
Landforms of Razavi Khorasan Province